Czysta may refer to:

Czysta, Pomeranian Voivodeship, Poland
Czysta, Świętokrzyskie Voivodeship, Poland

See also
Czysta Woda, Poland
Czysta Dębina, Poland
Czysta Dębina-Kolonia, Poland